Esophageal spasm is a disorder of motility of the esophagus.

There are two types of esophageal spasm:
 Diffuse or distal esophageal spasm (DES), where there is uncoordinated esophageal contractions
 Nutcracker esophagus (NE) also known as hypertensive peristalsis, where the contractions are coordinated but with an excessive amplitude.

Both conditions are linked to gastroesophageal reflux disease (GERD). DES and nutcracker esophagus present similarly and can may require esophageal manometry for differentiation.

When the coordinated muscle contraction are irregular or uncoordinated, this condition may be called diffuse esophageal spasm. These spasms can prevent food from reaching the stomach where food gets stuck in the esophagus. At other times the coordinated muscle contraction is very powerful, which is called nutcracker esophagus. These contractions move food through the esophagus but can cause severe pain.

Signs and symptoms
The symptoms may include trouble swallowing, regurgitation, chest pain, heartburn, globus pharyngis (which is a feeling that something is stuck in the throat) or a dry cough.

Causes
It is not clear what causes esophageal spasms. Sometimes esophageal spasms start when someone eats hot or cold foods or drinks. However, they can also occur without eating or drinking. The increased release of acetylcholine may also be a factor, but the triggering event is not known. Spasms may also be the result of a food intolerance.

Diagnosis
The diagnosis is generally confirmed by esophageal manometry. DES is present when more than a fifth of swallows results in distal esophageal contractions. NE is present if the average strength of the contractions of the distal esophagus is greater than 180 mmHg but the contraction of the esophagus is otherwise normal.

Differential diagnosis
Often, symptoms that may suggest esophageal spasm are the result of another condition such as food intolerance, gastroesophageal reflux disease (GERD) or achalasia. The symptoms can commonly be mistaken as heart palpitations.

Treatment
Since esophageal spasms are often associated with other disorders, management in these cases involve attempts to correct the underlying problem. Medications may include use of calcium channel blockers (CCBs) and nitrates. Tricyclic antidepressants (TCA) and sildenafil can be used as alternative treatment options. If caused by food allergy, an elimination diet may be necessary.

Procedures
If medical therapy fails either botulinum toxin injection or surgical myotomy may be tried in distal esophageal spasms.

Epidemiology
Distal esophageal spasms are rare.

References 

Abdomen
Digestive system
Diseases of oesophagus, stomach and duodenum